Andrija Luković (born 24 October 1994) is a Serbian footballer who plays as a centre midfielder in the Azerbaijani club Zira.

Club career

Rad
Luković made his professional debut on March 9, 2013, in a match against Smederevo under coach Marko Nikolić at the age of 18. In November 2013, he went on trial with R.S.C. Anderlecht and played a friendly match for Anderlecht against NAC Breda, after which it was announced that Anderlecht would consider signing Luković in the upcoming winter transfer window.

PSV
On 2 August 2014, Luković signed a three-year deal with Dutch Eredivisie side PSV Eindhoven.

Red Star Belgrade
On 21 June 2016, Luković signed a three-year deal with Red Star Belgrade.

Voždovac
On 30 August 2017, Luković joined Voždovac on a one season long loan.

Famalicão
On 5 August 2020, Luković joined Famalicão, at zero cost, by signing a three-year contract (ending at the end of the 2022–23 season, 30 June 2023) with the Portuguese club in the 2020–21 season.

Belenenses SAD
On 29 July 2021, he moved to Belenenses SAD.

International career
In his first major international tournament, Luković scored a total of two goals in the 2013 UEFA European Under-19 Football Championship. He scored against Turkey U19 on July 20, 2013, and then scored the game-winning goal in the 2013 UEFA European U19 Final match against France U19.

References

External links
 Profile on Official website
 
 
 Stats at Utakmica.rs

1994 births
Living people
Footballers from Belgrade
Association football midfielders
Serbian footballers
Serbia youth international footballers
Serbia under-21 international footballers
FK Rad players
FK BASK players
Red Star Belgrade footballers
PSV Eindhoven players
Raków Częstochowa players
F.C. Famalicão players
Belenenses SAD players
Zira FK players
Eredivisie players
Eerste Divisie players
Serbian SuperLiga players
Ekstraklasa players
Primeira Liga players
Azerbaijan Premier League players
Serbian expatriate footballers
Expatriate footballers in the Netherlands
Expatriate footballers in Poland
Expatriate footballers in Portugal
Expatriate footballers in Azerbaijan
Serbian expatriate sportspeople in the Netherlands
Serbian expatriate sportspeople in Poland
Serbian expatriate sportspeople in Portugal
Serbian expatriate sportspeople in Azerbaijan